Hong Kong Airways was a flag carrier of British Hong Kong during the late 1940s and 1950s.

Context of launch

In 1946 Jardine Air Maintenance Company (JAMCo) had been formed to serve the rapidly expanding portfolio of airlines serving Hong Kong and Jardine Airways was formed as the general sales agent in Hong Kong and China of BOAC and other carriers.   HKA was formed in 1947, by BOAC and Jardine, Matheson & Co.(怡和). Jardines wanted to develop a Hong Kong carrier with the support of a British government backed enterprise. BOAC wanted to create a feeder carrier to transport passengers from their London to Hong Kong service to onward destinations in China and the Far East.  Additionally the government in London wanted to develop a new market for British manufactured aircraft.  Jardines were general sales agents of HKA and became owners before selling to government backed partner BOAC.

Jardine/BOAC and Swire/Cathay Pacific battle for Hong Kong Aviation franchise

In May 1949 an agreement was signed by Cathay Pacific (Jock Swire) and BOAC (on behalf of Hong Kong Airways) along Governor Alexander Grantham's lines of route allocation to each party. Cathay secured the valuable routes to and from Bangkok, Singapore, Haiphong, Saigon, Sandakan, Jesselton (now Kota Kinabalu) and Labuan, and Rangoon (with an extension possible to Calcutta). That left HKA with Canton, Macao, Shanghai and Tientsin, not, after all, Japan. On 1 December 1949 BOAC sold Hong Kong Airways back to Jardines, but it soon ran for cover to another 'big brother', in a charter association with the American company Northwest Airlines on the Taipei and Tokyo services. Then in 1953, the British Government attempted to bring about a merger between Cathay Pacific, BOAC and Hong Kong Airways to form a single regional airline.   This eventually led to Cathay Pacific taking over Hong Kong Airways on 1 July 1959 with BOAC getting 15 per cent of Cathay Pacific's shares and a seat on the Board.

Legacy

JAMco was merged with Swire/Cathay Pacific maintenance interests, to form HAECO, on 1 November 1950. After the merger of JAMCo to form HAECO Jardines did receive a parcel of HAECO shares but this gradually waned.  HKA itself merged with Cathay Pacific on 1 July 1959. Jardine Airways remained the exclusive General Sales Agent in Hong Kong for British Airways until the year 2000. Another Jardine affiliate Eupo Air chartered seats for distribution primarily amongst the Chinese community on British Airways flights on the Hong Kong to London route from 1983 to 2002, a similar partnership to that of HKA and Northwest Airlines in the 1950s. Today (2013) Jardines (怡和) largest aviation interest in Hong Kong is Jardine Aviation Services a ground handling business, however, Eupo Air still partners British Airways and Jardine Travel provides retail agency service plus corporate travel & expense management.   The Swire Group is still (2013) the principal shareholder in Cathay Pacific. Dragonair, now owned by Cathay Pacific as Cathay Dragon, is flying some of the routes originally pioneered by HKA.   On this basis it can be concluded that the battle for Hong Kong aviation was roundly won by the Swire Group.

Fleet 
Hong Kong Airways operated a fleet of aircraft including:
 1 Douglas DC-3
 1 Douglas DC-4
 2 Vickers Viscount V760D
 VR-HFI leased from BOAC Associated Companies – sold to Malayan Airways in 1959
 VR-HFJ leased from BOAC Associated Companies – sold to Malayan Airways in 1959

Destinations 
 British Hong Kong
 Hong Kong – Kai Tak Airport Main hub
 China
 Guangzhou – Pai Yuen Airport
 Shanghai – Shanghai Longhua Airport
 Taipei (until 1949)
 Taiwan (since 1949)
 Taipei - Taipei Songshan Airport
 Japan
 Tokyo - Haneda Airport
Ryukyu Islands
 Okinawa - Naha Airport
 Philippines
 Manila - Nichols Field
 South Korea
Seoul - Gimpo International Airport

Incidents and accidents 
 On 11 July 1949, a Hong Kong Airways Douglas DC-3 (VR-HDQ) from Hong Kong to Canton, overran the runway during takeoff and crashed into the water.  The aircraft sank after the rescue operations.  There were 11 occupants on board the aircraft, three crew and eight passengers, with no fatalities reported.

References 

pg 117 of "Beyond Lion Rock" Young, Gavin 1988
pg 236 of "The Thistle & the Jade" Keswick, Maggie Ed. 1982

Defunct airlines of Hong Kong
Airlines established in 1947
Airlines disestablished in 1959
1947 establishments in Hong Kong
Jardine Matheson Group